Tibor Csernai (3 December 1938 – 11 September 2012) was a Hungarian footballer who competed at the 1964 Summer Olympics. He was part of the gold medal winning team. His brother is Pál Csernai.

References

1938 births
2012 deaths
Hungarian footballers
Association football forwards
Olympic footballers of Hungary
Olympic gold medalists for Hungary
Olympic medalists in football
Footballers at the 1964 Summer Olympics
Medalists at the 1964 Summer Olympics
People from Pilis
Sportspeople from Pest County